KOZR-LP (102.9 FM) is a radio station licensed to serve Gentry, Arkansas.  The station is owned by Gentry Communications Network Inc. It airs a Christian radio format deriving a portion of its programming from Radio 74 Internationale.

The station was assigned the KOZR-LP call letters by the Federal Communications Commission on April 20, 2004.

References

External links
 
KOZR-LP service area per the FCC database

OZR-LP
OZR-LP
Gentry, Arkansas
Radio 74 Internationale radio stations
2004 establishments in Arkansas
Radio stations established in 2004